This list of museums in Atlanta is a list of museums, defined for this context as institutions (including nonprofit organizations, government entities, and private businesses) that collect and care for objects of cultural, artistic, scientific, or historical interest and make their collections or related exhibits available for public viewing. Also included are non-profit and university art galleries. Museums that exist only in cyberspace (i.e., virtual museums) are not included.

This list includes museums in the City of Atlanta and the immediately adjacent communities of Druid Hills, and Hapeville at Atlanta's airport. For museums in the rest of Metro Atlanta and the rest of the state of Georgia, see List of museums in Georgia (U.S. state).

Museums

Defunct museums
 Atlanta Cyclorama & Civil War Museum, closed in 2015, cyclorama now at the Atlanta History Center

See also
 Historic landmarks in Georgia
 Museums list
 Nature Centers in Georgia
 Registered Historic Places in Georgia

References

Atlanta
Atlanta
Museums
Museums
Museums in Atlanta
 
Tourist attractions in Atlanta
Museums